Kisra (also spelled kissra) is a popular thin fermented bread made in Chad, Sudan and South Sudan. It is made from durra or wheat. There are two different forms of kisra: thin baked sheets, known as kisra rhaheeefa, which is similar to injera; and a porridge known as kisra aseeda or aceda. The latter is usually paired with a meat and vegetable stew, such as mullah. As of 1995, the then-undivided country of Sudan ate an estimated  of sorghum flour annually in kisra.

See also
 List of breads
 Sudanese cuisine
 Lahoh

References

Breads
Staple foods
Chadian cuisine
Sudanese cuisine
South Sudanese cuisine